Janiabad may refer to:
 Janiabad, Farashband, Fars Province
 Janiabad, Firuzabad, Fars Province
 Janiabad, Rostam, Fars Province
 Janiabad, Kerman